Uzuaba is a village in southeastern Nigeria. It is located near the city of Owerri.

Towns in Imo State
Villages in Igboland